The Nevada Joint Union High School District is a high school district in Grass Valley, California,  near Sacramento, California.

The superintendent is Brett McFadden. It is located at 11645 Ridge Road. Its schools include Bear River High School, Nevada Union High School, Ghidotti Early College High School, Silver Springs High School, North Point Academy and Nevada Union Adult School. It has an attendance of about 3,950 students.

References

External links
About the Nevada Joint High School District

Grass Valley, California
School districts in Nevada County, California